Josef "Pepi" Bican (25 September 1913 – 12 December 2001) was an Austrian-Czech professional footballer who played as a striker. He is the second-most prolific goalscorer in official matches in recorded history according to Rec.Sport.Soccer Statistics Foundation (RSSSF), with over 950 goals scored in 624 matches.

According to RSSSF, Bican scored over 1813 total goals in over 1089 total matches. In total Bican scored 1137 unofficial goals in more than 514 games for Slavia Praha, with a ratio of 2.21 goals per game across his almost 15-year career at the club in total.

Bican began his professional career at Rapid Vienna in 1931. After four years at Rapid, he moved to local rivals Admira Vienna. Bican won four league titles during his time in Austria, moved to Slavia Praha in 1937, where he stayed until 1948, and became the club's all-time top goalscorer. He later played for FC Vitkovice, FC Hradec Králové, and Dynamo Praha, retiring in 1955 as the all-time top goalscorer in the Czechoslovak First League with 447 goals. According to UEFA, the governing body for European football, he is the leading all-time goalscorer in European top-flight leagues with 518 goals (447 in Czechoslovakia and 71 in Austria), narrowly ahead of Hungarian Ferenc Puskás.

Bican was a member of the Austrian Wunderteam of the 1930s and represented the nation at the 1934 FIFA World Cup, where they reached the semi-finals. He later switched allegiance to the Czechoslovakia national football team, but a clerical error related to his transfer of national team precluded him from playing in the 1938 FIFA World Cup. Bican was a tall and powerful player, with the technical ability to play with both feet, and had considerable pace. During his athletic prime, he was reportedly capable of running 100 metres in 10.8 seconds, which was not far off the leading sprinters of his time.

After his retirement from playing, Bican became a manager, and coached various teams from the 1950s until the 1970s. In 1998, Bican was given a "Medal of Honour" by the International Federation of Football History & Statistics (IFFHS) for being among the world's most successful top division goalscorers of all time. In 2000, the IFFHS awarded Bican the "Golden Ball" in recognition of his status as the greatest goalscorer of the 20th century. The award was based on how many times a player had been top scorer in his domestic league, a feat which Bican achieved 12 times.

Early life 
Josef Bican was born in Favoriten, Vienna, Austria-Hungary, to parents František Bican and Ludmila Kopecka, at Quellenstrasse 101. He was the second of three children, František, Josef and Vilík. His father was from Sedlice in Southern Bohemia, and his mother was a Viennese Czech. He fought in World War I and returned uninjured. However, František died at the early age of 30 in 1921 after refusing an operation to treat an infected kidney after an injury sustained during a football match. This was when František was just 10, Josef was 8 and Vilík was 3. Hertha Vienna officials gave František a nice funeral and told Ludmila that they would take care of her sons and would even give them an education. At first they visited the boys every day and would bring something to help out. However this soon changed as they would come every week, once a fortnight and within three months it was as if they had forgotten about the Bican family. Ludmila was stuck in a desperate situation, she sent Vilík to be looked after by his grandparents in Bohemia, until he was 14. Ludmila's life got harder as she had to work twice as hard as before, cleaning crayfish and washing dishes at a nearby restaurant. Most days she would have to get up at four in the morning to come home at ten, but sometimes even later.

The family's poverty meant that Bican initially had to play football without shoes, which helped him improve his ball control skills. Bican attended the Jan Amos Komenský school, a Czech school in Vienna. For entertainment František and Josef would make a football out of old material and sometimes Ludmila would be left without one stocking. On some days they would arrive at school with dirty clothes and foreheads due to playing football before school. They would play matches between classes and betwe n schools, they had no time to study. Josef would play football so much that she had to lock him indoors to try and get him to study. The players at his school would whistle and call to Josef to get him to come to a match that day. He lived one story up, but this didn't stop him. He climbed out the window and played the game. The school team was victorious as the score was 12–2, Josef had scored 8 goals.

His older brother, František, was also a good footballer, as he started playing for Hertha Vienna, aged 11. However, František died tragically at 17. They had brought him home with a knife in his heart. They had told the Bican family that it was a very unfortunate accident that he had taken his own life. In situations like these Ludmila was normally brave, however this time she was scared and she sent Josef to live with Vilík and his grandparents.

Working at Schustek parquet factory, Josef would work around the office and in the warehouse and earnt twenty shillings a week. In the spring of 1931 Farbenlutz attracted Bican to start working for them as he would earn 30 shillings a week.

Early career
At Hertha, he was coached by a former player that had played with his father. The Hertha Vienna pitch was only a few steps away from his house. Bican was the smallest of the boys there, however, his ability to score goals caught the attention of everyone around. One of the club’s officials was so impressed that he told him, “You’ll get a shilling every time you score.” He scored two in his very first match. Thus, football became a vital income to the poor Bican family.

As his career slowed down at Hertha Vienna, due to him not playing for almost half a year, one of his friends invited him to play for Schustek. It was a parquet factory, small but profitable. At the age of 15, in the autumn of 1928, Bican made his debut for Schustek. Josef scored three goals in a 5–2 friendly victory over Nord Vienna. It is said that once his mother, who had come to watch him, was so annoyed about a foul her son received that she ran onto the pitch and beat the opponent with her umbrella. In 1931 he would start playing for Farbenlutz and would not even train.

Near to where Bican lived, Roman Schramseis also resided and after seeing Bican play on several occasions, Roman offered him the chance to train at Rapid Wien. “I already told Richard Kuthan about it.” In his first youth game for the club, he scored seven goals, and so he was promoted to the Amateur side, which was typically for 18- and 19-year-olds. Bican was invited to watch a training session with the amateur team, but as soon as he and his friend watched the others play they got scared and headed home. The next Tuesday, Bican was to play a training game between the junior team and the amateur team. He played for the junior team and scored five goals as they won 7–2. On the Sunday of the same week, he was again invited to play for the adult team. Rapid Wien beat their opponents 4–2 with two goals from Bican. After three months, in June 1931, he was promoted to the Reserves.

Club career

Rapid Vienna 
In 1931, when Bican first joined Rapid Vienna, he received 150 schillings, but, by the age of 20, Rapid wanted to keep him so much that they paid him 600 schillings. In 1931, for Rapid Vienna's Reserve team, Josef scored 30 goals in 16 games. In his debut game against Austria Wien, club where Matthias Sindelar played, Bican scored four goals in a victory 5–3.

Bican recalls the game as this: "Sometime in the tenth minute, I received the ball from the right, in a large amount of space, went around Gall and with my left foot, I scored the first goal, into the corner. Weselik broke through and struck a shot that hit the cross bar, on the rebound I hooked the ball into to the net, again, with my left foot. Before halftime, I scored my third goal, a nice, clean instep at full speed. My teammates rushed towards me and carried me to the center of the field. For my fourth, I luckily got past Mock and only Gall was in front of me, he took me to the ground, but I was still able to shoot and score the decisive fifth goal. When the match was over, everyone was kissing me. But in the dressing room they had to cut open my sleeve, to get my shirt off me. I had finished the game with a swollen wrist. I didn't even notice it. The joy was greater than the pain". In 1932 Josef scored 51 goals in 42 games for Rapid Vienna. 23 goals in 9 reserve team games and 28 goals in 33 first team games In 1933 Josef signed a contract to play a game for Wiener AC, in which they beat Phonix Schwechat 6-2, with Josef scoring 4.

Bican won the Austrian title with Rapid in 1934–35 and his first goalscoring accolade, but by the end of the season, he had been suspended after refusing to sign a new contract and Bican decided to go on strike. In total for Rapid Vienna, Josef played 156 games and scored 201 goals. Through one of his uncles, a deal was done with Admira Wien, at the time the most successful side in Austrian history. Rapid however, refused to release his registration, and Bican went nine months without playing a game. When he was allowed to leave, Bican won championships in both his seasons with the Vienna club, but his heart was set on his family's homeland.

Slavia Prague 
During early January 1937, Bican left Admira Vienna to join Czech club Slavia Prague, he signed a contract for them, despite being on a friendly tour of Egypt. His contract had already ended for Admira Vienna, in 1936, however he was still allowed to play for them. The Austrian Union needed Bican for an inter-state match, they demanded Bican to sign a contract at the beginning of December, if he did not do so, his old contract would be extended for a year. However, Bican did not back down and was adamant to leave.

In his first season at the club, Bican was both the league's top scorer with 22 goals and the 1938 Mitropa Cup with 10 goals, and altough Slavia finished as runner-ups in the league, they won the cup after a 4–2 aggregate win over Ferencváros,  with Bican netting once in the first leg. The following season, in March 1939, Germany invaded Czechoslovakia and football split on similar lines, with Bohemian and Moravian clubs carrying their results from the Czechoslovak league into the new Bohemian-Moravian league. Bican was again the top scorer of the league, this time with 29 goals, but Sparta Prague, Slavia's greatest rival, won the championship again.

The third year (1941), Bican's won his first of four Championships along with the third of 10 consecutive goalscoring accolades. He played for Slavia throughout World War II, while many of his football rivals were at war. During eight league seasons he scored 328 goals, including 57 in 26 matches one particular season (1943–44). During the 1939–40 season, he set a world record for the longest goal-scoring streak in a European top division when he scored at least one goal for 19 games in a row, netting a total of 47 goals over his run that included hat-tricks in 5 back-to-back league games. His record stood for 73 years until it was broken in 2013 by Lionel Messi (21 games in the Spanish league). Three times in his career, Bican scored seven goals in a game. In a 1939–40 league match against Zlín, Bican found the net seven times as Slavia ran out 10–1 winners. During the 1940–41 season, Bican matched his feat of the previous season, again against Zlín, scoring seven times, as Slavia won by a 12–1 scoreline. It was 1947–48 before Bican managed his third seven-goal match, as Slavia defeated České Budějovice in a game which finished 15–1.

He was in the leagues that he played, the top-scorer 12 times during his 25-year professional career and Europe's and the world's top scorer in five consecutive seasons, from 1939–40 to 1943–44, a record that still stands.

Last years 
Several clubs were interested in signing Bican after the war ended. nBican joined steel works Železárny Vítkovice. During 1952, he joined FC Hradec Králové, where he managed to score 53 goals in 26 matches. On 1 May 1953, the Communist Party forced him to leave the city and, therefore, the club. After being forced to leave, he returned to Slavia Prague, or, as it was known then, Dynamo Prague. He continued to play for Dynamo until retiring from playing at the age of 42 in 1955. He was the oldest player in the league at that time.

International career 
On 29 November 1933, aged 20 years and 64 days, Bican made his debut for Austria in a 2–2 draw against Scotland. He later played for them at the 1934 World Cup, when the Austrian Wunderteam reached the semifinals. His solitary goal in the tournament came in extra time of Austria's 3–2 win over France.

At the time Bican was playing for Slavia Prague, he applied for Czechoslovak citizenship. However, when he eventually became a Czechoslovak citizen, he discovered that a clerical error meant he couldn't play at the 1938 World Cup. He scored two hat-tricks for Czechoslovakia, including a four-goal haul against Romania in the 1937–38 Eduard Benes Cup in a 6–2 win. He also played for Bohemia & Moravia, playing only one match for them against Nazi Germany on 12 November 1939, and scoring a hat-trick in a 4–4 draw. In total, he scored 29 goals in 34 international matches for three national teams (Austria, Czechoslovakia and Bohemia & Moravia). His final national team appearance was for Czechoslovakia in a 3–1 defeat against Bulgaria on 4 September 1949, a few days short from his 36th birthday.

However, his success did have a disadvantage. Other members of the team became jealous of the tall, handsome Bican's success, and he was sometimes called abusive names, such as "Austrian bastard".

In addition to representing Austria, Czechoslovakia and the region of Bohemia & Moravia, Bican also played a number of fixtures playing for teams consisting of the best players from a league or town between 1939 and 1949. For the Bohemia-Moravia league team in 1939 he played six games scoring nine goals, for the Bohemia league team in 1940–1944 he played eight games scoring 11 goals, for Prague from 1938 to 1948 he played 12 games scoring 11 goals and Ostrava in 1950–51 he played ten games scoring 10 goals, bringing Bican's total number of official goals outside of club football to 67 goals in 69 games.

Personal life
Grandfather František and Grandmother Terezie were one of the poorest families of the town. Grandfather František’s second son Josef, died during the war and for financial support they took 50 koruna per month. The start of young Josef’s love for fishing came when Grandfather František took him and Vilík to a nearby river and the boys would fish either side of František. His refusal is described in the book: "I was born in Vienna, but my father was Czech, just like my mother," he finally declared. "I always felt like a Czech, and if I did something else, my dad would turn in his grave!" Although the author was based on contemporary sources, he considers these words to be credible. "When I spoke to him, he always emphasized his Czechness," reveals Zikmund.

Life after retirement

Tongeren  hired him as a coach in 1968, where he had some success taking them from Division 4 to Division 2.

Around this time, Pelé was getting ready for his 1000th goal and many journalists were searching for another player who had scored a thousand goals. Former Austrian player Franz "Bimbo" Binder suggested Bican, who he claimed to have scored over 5000 goals in all competitions. When reporters asked Bican why he had not sought more attention for his goalscoring feats, he simply said, "who'd have believed me if I said I'd scored five times as many goals as Pelé?" However, to score over 5000 goals he should have kept an average of 185 goals/year along all his 27 years of career, but only counting goals in official matches, Bican scored at least 950 goals. Bican's goal-scoring feats are often forgotten because he did not make a big fuss about it in the media. His record is often overshadowed by Pelé's 1303 goal record, including goals in unofficial matches. But shortly before his death in 2001, IFFHS based on RSSSF statistics declared Bican with 643 league goals, the most prolific scorer of the 20th century. This was judged by the number of times a player had been top scorer in his domestic league. Bican managed this feat 12 times, more than any other player in football history.

In the 1990s, Bican spoke to Czech TV about the difficulty of scoring during his era: "When I talk to young reporters, they always say, 'Mr Bican, scoring was easier back in your day.' But I ask them, 'How come? Look, are there opportunities today?' And they tell me, 'Of course there are, many of them'. And I say, 'There you go. If there weren't opportunities, it would be difficult. But if there are, scoring is the same as it was a hundred years ago, and will be the same in a hundred years' time, too. It will always be the same." Bican further stated: "Everybody would agree that a chance should be a goal. If I got five chances, I scored five goals – if I got seven then it was seven."

"Bican was incredibly unlucky at the height of his career. There was no World Cup in 1942 or 1946 because of the war. If the 1942 edition had taken place, for example, he would surely have become more widely known. Perhaps he might even have been as famous as Pele", Radovan Jelinek, sports historian said about him.

Death 
Bican died in Prague on 12 December 2001 at the age of 88.

On 25 September 2013, which would have been Bican's 100th birthday, Slavia Prague commemorated him by wearing shirts that featured a replica of his signature on them.

Career statistics

Club

International

Scores and results list Austria's, Czechoslovakia's and Bohemia and Moravia's goal tally first, score column indicates score after each Bican goal.

Style of play 
After a game for Rapid Vienna against Austria Vienna, an author in the Austrian newspaper Montagblatt, wrote; “Bican is not the conductor with a great concept. His game is excessive, his assists are difficult to achieve due to their unsaved accuracy.

After an Admira Vienna game against Red Star Vienna, in 1936, an author in the Austrian newspaper Montagblatt, wrote: "The most mentioned player on the field was undeniably Bican, not only because of his transfer issues, but also for his truly remarkable performances. His dribbling, fine ball control, and deceiving his opponents were a real feast for the eyes of the spectators. After all, this time Bican was also his team's most successful player, scoring three goals."

Recalling Bican, his former Slavia team-mate Jan Andrejkovič said; "Pepi was a player with all the qualities of a star. Excellent technique with left or right foot, outstanding headers, perfect positional play, precise passing and, above all, an incredible goalscorer".

Honours
Rapid Wien
 Austrian Championship: 1934–35

Admira Wien
 Austrian Championship: 1935–36, 1936–37

Slavia Prague
Czechoslovak First League: 1939–40, 1940–41, 1941–42, 1942–43, 1946–47, 1948
Czechoslovak Cup: 1940–41, 1941–42
Central Bohemian Cup: 1940–41, 1943, 1944
Liberty Cup: 1945
Mitropa Cup: 1938

Individual
Austrian Championship Top Scorer: 1933–34
Czechoslovak First League Top Scorer: 1937–38, 1938–39, 1939–40, 1940–41, 1941–42, 1942–43, 1943–44, 1945–46, 1946–47, 1948, 1950
Czechoslovak Second League Top Scorer: 1949, 1952
Top league scorer in Europe: 1939–40, 1940–41, 1941–42, 1942–43, 1943–44

See also
 List of men's footballers with 500 or more goals
 List of world association football records

Notes

References

External links

 

Austria international footballers
Austrian footballers
Czechoslovakia international footballers
Czechoslovak footballers
Czech footballers
1934 FIFA World Cup players
SK Rapid Wien players
FC Hradec Králové players
SK Slavia Prague players
MFK Vítkovice players
Czechoslovak football managers
Czech football managers
SK Slavia Prague managers
FC Slovan Liberec managers
FC Zbrojovka Brno managers
1. FK Příbram managers
FC Hradec Králové managers
SK Kladno managers
Footballers from Vienna
Dual internationalists (football)
Austrian people of Czech descent
Austrian expatriate sportspeople in Czechoslovakia
Czech people of Austrian descent
1913 births
2001 deaths
Association football forwards
Burials at Vyšehrad Cemetery